The 1907 Wisconsin Badgers football team represented the University of Wisconsin as a member of the Western Conference during the 1907 college football season. Led by Charles P. Hutchins in his second and final season as head coach, the Badgers compiled an overall record of 3–1–1 with an identical mark in conference play, placing second in the Western Conference. The team's captain was John Messmer.

Schedule

References

Wisconsin
Wisconsin Badgers football seasons
Wisconsin Badgers football